Livoniana is a genus of prehistoric lobe-finned fish which lived during the Devonian period (Givetian - Frasnian stages, about 374 - 391 million years ago).

This species is a transitional form between fish and the earliest tetrapods, like Tiktaalik, Ichthyostega and Acanthostega. Before Livoniana there was Elginerpeton and Obruchevichthys.

Four legs developed in water, not on land, to better escape waterliving predatory creatures like Hyneria. There were very lush forests, and particularly swamps, where four limbs became very useful to avoid predators.

References

External links 
 Livoniana multidentata at Devonian Times

Elpistostegalians
Prehistoric lobe-finned fish genera
Transitional fossils
Devonian fish of Europe